Avalon Wasteneys (born August 31, 1997) is a Canadian rower. Wasteneys's hometown is Campbell River, British Columbia and resides in Victoria, British Columbia.

Wasteneys was a former cross-country skier, who was discovered as a natural fit for rowing in 2017 as part of the RBC Training Ground program, where she was named regional champion.

Personal life
Wasteneys' mom Heather Clarke competed at the 1988 Summer Olympics in the women's coxed four event, while her aunt Christine Clarke competed at the 1984 Summer Olympics in the eights boat.

Career
Wasteneys is a one time U-23 World Champion in the women's eights boat, in 2018. Later in 2018, Wasteneys helped the senior women's eights boat to a silver at the World Cup III Regatta in Lucerne Switzerland. In 2019, Wasteneys was part of the eights boat, finishing in fourth at the World Championships and qualifying Canada the boat for the 2020 Summer Olympics.

In June 2021, Wasteneys was named to Canada's 2020 Olympic team in the women's eights boat. At the Olympics, the boat won the gold medal, Canada's first in the event since 1992.

References

External links

1997 births
Canadian female rowers
Living people
Rowers from Toronto
Rowers from Victoria, British Columbia
People from Campbell River, British Columbia
Canadian female cross-country skiers
Rowers at the 2020 Summer Olympics
Medalists at the 2020 Summer Olympics
Olympic medalists in rowing
Olympic gold medalists for Canada
21st-century Canadian women
World Rowing Championships medalists for Canada